Paul Earl Scranton Jr. appeared in five games and scored nine points.

References

Paul Earl Scranton Jr. was a professional basketball player who played in the ABA (American Basketball Association ). He was present on the teams Anaheim Amigos and the Boston Celtics. He was born April 30, 1944. He shares the same birthday with his former wife Brenda Joyce Scranton who died in 2006.  He has three kids with the names of  Damen Scranton, Leako Scranton, and Shaun Francis Scranton. Shaun Scranton has a wife, LaTanya Scranton, and two kids, Rayven Scranton and Maxwell Scranton. Paul was an all American college basketball player.

In pre-season Paul averaged 17 points and 15 rebounds in the ABA.  Later on he unfortunately got injured and therefore couldn't continue in any other games until international basketball. 

1944 births
Living people
American expatriate basketball people in China
American expatriate basketball people in Hong Kong
American expatriate basketball people in Japan
American expatriate basketball people in the Philippines
American men's basketball players
Anaheim Amigos players
Basketball players from Los Angeles
California State Polytechnic University, Pomona faculty
Cal Poly Pomona Broncos men's basketball players
Forwards (basketball)
New Haven Elms players